The Dead Sea Apes is a story of dwellers by the Dead Sea who, according to the Muslim tradition, were transformed into apes for breaking the Sabbath. A similar story is found in Jewish traditions, when people built the tower of Babel were punished by turning into apes and phantoms. Further it might be a reference to a Yemeni midrash. It is also a metaphor used, for instance by Thomas Carlyle, describing people in modern times to whom the universe, with all its serious voices, seems to have become a weariness and a humbug.

References

Islamic legendary creatures
Legendary mammals
Dead Sea